Elizabeth "Betty" Cox was an English stage actress of the seventeenth century.

Life 
Her debut was in March 1671 when she acted Lydia in William Wycherley's Love in a Wood, for the King's Company, based at the Theatre Royal, Drury Lane. She left the stage in 1675 but returned briefly in 1682.

Selected roles
 Lydia in Love in a Wood by William Wycherley (1671)
 Violetta in The Assignation by John Dryden (1672)
 Palmrya in Marriage à la mode by John Dryden (1672)
 Octavia in Nero by Nathaniel Lee (1674)
 Constantia in The Amorous Old Woman by Thomas Duffet (1674)
 Desdemona in Othello by William Shakespeare (1675)
 Panthea in A King and No King by John Fletcher (1675)
 Indamora in Aureng-zebe by John Dryden (1675)
Sophonisba in Sophonisba by Nathaniel Lee (1675)
 Artemira in The Heir of Morocco by Elkanah Settle (1682)

References

Bibliography
 Highfill, Philip H, Burnim, Kalman A. & Langhans, Edward A. A Biographical Dictionary of Actors, Actresses, Musicians, Dancers, Managers & Other Stage Personnel in London, 1660–1800:. SIU Press, 1982.
 Lanier, Henry Wysham. The First English Actresses: From the Initial Appearance of Women on the Stage in 1660 Till 1700. The Players, 1930.
 Van Lennep, W. The London Stage, 1660–1800: Volume One, 1660–1700. Southern Illinois University Press, 1960.

17th-century English people
English stage actresses
17th-century English actresses
Year of birth unknown
Year of death unknown